Peter Carr (born 25 August 1951) is an English retired professional football defender. He spent four seasons in the North American Soccer League, at least one in the Major Indoor Soccer League and two in the American Soccer League.

Career
Carr signed with Darlington F.C. when he was fifteen. He played for the New England Tea Men of the North American Soccer League each summer from 1979 to 1980. He became a free agent when the Tea Men moved to Jacksonville in 1981. He subsequently signed with the Washington Diplomats. In the fall of 1981, he signed with the Cleveland Force of the Major Indoor Soccer League. He played in only fourteen games and was released at the end of the season. In 1982, he moved to the Georgia Generals of the second division American Soccer League. In 1983, he played for the Pennsylvania Stoners. In 1985, he played for the Greek American AA in the Cosmopolitan Soccer League.

References

External links
NASL stats

1951 births
American Soccer League (1933–1983) players
Carlisle United F.C. players
Cleveland Force (original MISL) players
Darlington F.C. players
English footballers
English expatriate footballers
Georgia Generals players
Greek American AA players
Hartlepool United F.C. players
Major Indoor Soccer League (1978–1992) players
Motherwell F.C. players
New England Tea Men players
North American Soccer League (1968–1984) players
Pennsylvania Stoners players
Washington Diplomats (NASL) players
Living people
Association football defenders
English expatriate sportspeople in the United States
Expatriate soccer players in the United States
People from Bishop Middleham
Footballers from County Durham